Bellavista Airport is an airport serving Río Claro, a commune in the Maule Region of Chile.

See also

Transport in Chile
List of airports in Chile

References

External links
OpenStreetMap - Bellavista
OurAirports - Bellavista
FallingRain - Bellavista Airport

Airports in Maule Region